Guiding Lights is the second studio album by progressive metal band Skyharbor. It was released on November 10, 2014 through Basick Records.

Track listing

Personnel
Skyharbor
Daniel Tompkins – Vocals, vocal engineering
Keshav Dhar – Guitars, guitar and bass engineering
Devesh Dayal – Guitars
Krishna Jhaveri – Bass guitar
Anup Sastry – Drums, drum engineering

Additional personnel
Forrester Savell – Mixing, mastering
Anupam Roy – Additional bass engineering
Michael Di Lonardo – Artwork, visual concept
Mark Holcomb – Second guitar solo on 'Allure'
Valentina Reptile – Guest vocals on 'Kaikoma'
Plini Roessler-Holgate – Guitar solo on 'The Constant'
Randy Slaugh – Arranging and engineering string quartet on 'Patience'

References

2014 albums
Skyharbor albums
Basick Records albums